Jessica Garvin is an American politician serving as a member of the Oklahoma Senate from the 43rd district. Elected in November 2020, she assumed office on January 11, 2021.

Early life and education 
Garvin was born in Marshall, Minnesota and raised in Marlow, Oklahoma. She earned a Bachelor of Arts degree in communications with a minor in psychology from the University of Oklahoma.

Career 
Prior to entering politics, Garvin worked as an assisted living and nursing home administrator. She is the executive vice president of Bison Health Care Management and also owns a hospice organization. Garvin was elected to the Oklahoma Senate in November 2020 and assumed office on January 11, 2021. On May 5, 2021, Garvin co-founded the Oklahoma Legislative Latino Caucus.

References 

Living people
Hispanic and Latino American state legislators in Oklahoma
Hispanic and Latino American women in politics
People from Marshall, Minnesota
People from Marlow, Oklahoma
University of Oklahoma alumni
Republican Party Oklahoma state senators
Women state legislators in Oklahoma
Year of birth missing (living people)
21st-century American politicians
21st-century American women politicians